Portfolio is the seventeenth (17th) studio album by Puerto Rican singer Yolandita Monge. It was released in 1990 and it was the final studio album under her CBS Records contract.  This release includes the hits "Cantaré", "Sin Amor", and the club hit "Fuiste Un Sueño".  Seven out of ten tracks in this album were composed by Venezuelan singer/songwriter Ricardo Montaner. The breathtaking album's cover picture was taken by late photographer and stylist Raúl Torres and is a black and white picture, hand painted.

The song "Fuiste Un Sueño" was remixed by DJs Pablo Flores and Javier Garza and also became a massive club hit in Puerto Rico and USA.  The singer filmed a music video for that song (directed by her brother in law Eric Mamery) and it won many awards for its technical and artistic values.  The track "Cantaré" became an anthem due to the AIDS epidemic and the Persian Gulf War.

Just when everyone thought that after the success of Vivencias, Yolandita Monge would return with a similar production (an album of strong ballads), the singer surprised everyone with a light, fresh and very musical offering. "Portfolio" is one of her richest work in musical terms and as far as arrangements are concerned. In "Portfolio" Yolandita seemed reborn, as suggested by its beautiful cover picture.

This album earned Gold status and is out of print in all formats. Several hits songs appear in various compilations of the singer available as digital downloads at iTunes and Amazon.

Track listing

Credits and personnel

Vocals: Yolandita Monge
Producer: Pablo Manavello
Programming & Keyboards: Iker Gastaminza
Piano Montuno: Joel Uriola
Percussion: Carlos 'Nene' Quintero
Drums: Ricardo Delgado
Guitars: Pablo Manavello
Brass: Gustavo Arangurén, Rafael Araujo, Ramón Carranza, Jacinto Parra, Héctor Velázquez, Geomar Hernández
Sax: Ed Calle
Chorus: Sofía 'Nena' Pulido, Francis Benítez, Beatriz Corona, Edgar Salazar, Oscar Galian, Zenko Matousck

Engineer: Víctor Di Persia
Mixing: Gaetano Bellomo
Assistants: Jim Thomas, Gary Bosko, Riley J. Cornell
Hair: Fernando Báez
Make-up: Raúl Torres 
Photography and Art Design: Raúl Torres

Notes

Track listing and credits from album booklet.
Released in Cassette Format on 1990 (DIC-80391).
Released in CD Format on 1990 (CD-80391).

Charts

Albums

Singles

References

Yolandita Monge albums
1990 albums